Gatter Autowerk Reichstadt was a Czechoslovak  automobile manufacturing company founded in 1930 in Reichstadt/Zakupy, Czechoslovakia by the Sudeten German automotive pioneer  (1896-1973). It produced small, affordable cars and advertised these as “Volksauto” or “Volkswagen”, a “Car for the People”. Its car production ended in 1937 when economic crisis hit the industrialized border zones of Czechoslovakia with their mainly ethnic German population. However, after the Second World War and his expulsion from Czechoslovakia, Willibald Gatter build another small car in Western Germany, the so-called Gatter-Mini (1952-1956) which remained a prototype.

History

First Prototypes

When the Gatter company was founded in 1930 in Reichstadt/Zakupy, its founder Willibald Gatter had already 15 years of experience in this industry. From 1915 to 1918 he had worked for the Škoda Works in the production of so-called C-Trains – transport engines for Skoda's heavy mortars, such as the Skoda 305 mm Model 1911. Following the First World War, Gatter worked as lead engineer and department head for Austro Daimler in Wiener Neustadt. He played a major role in the development of Austro Daimler's models AD 6-17 (1921–1924), ADM II (1923-1927), and ADV (1924–1927). Together with Ferdinand Porsche, then technical director of Austro Daimler, Gatter developed the 1.3-liter "Sascha" racing cars. Within Austro Daimler, a company then producing mainly luxury cars for the upper class, Willibald Gatter lobbied for the production of small and affordable vehicles for the working class. When this call went unheard, Gatter finally left Austro Daimler in 1926. In collaboration with the Schicht AG, a large industrial lubricant company in Ústí nad Labem (formerly known by its German name Aussig an der Elbe), Gatter produced between 1926 and 1929 the so-called “European Car” or “Modell Schreckenstein” (named after Ústí nad Labem's robust castle).
Several prototypes of this car were built which carried a “Gatter” logo. Willibald Gatter built these vehicle based on own patents for axles and gear box. The car was favorably reviewed by the automobile press. The Great Depression, however, brought this endeavor to an abrupt end in 1929.

Serial Production of the “Small Gatter”

Having recovered from this shock and having secured sufficient financing, Willibald Gatter founded in 1930 an own automobile company in Zakupy (formerly known by its German name Reichstadt). The company's name was recorded as “Gatter Autowerk Reichstadt” (Czech: “Gatter Autopodnik Zákupy”) in the city's annals.

From 1930 to 1937 Gatter Autowerk Reichstadt produced some 1650 vehicles. Some Czech authors give considerably lower numbers, based on lists of vehicle registrations in Czechoslovakia. These studies omit however cars sold to the German Reich, where the Gatter company had several sales outlets, such as in Saxony and in Franconia

Seven different models are known. The 1930 model was a two-seater with baggage compartment. It had a length of 2.6 Meters and was equipped with an air-cooled two-stroke Villers engine with 9 h.p. In order to reduce weight, the first “Kleine Gatter” model had only one central headlight, one door only, and had no reverse gear.
Later models of the „Kleine Gatter” were more elegant four-seaters with an aerodynamic body. Gatter now produced his own motors, which were produced in Warnsdorf in the Julius Winkler Foundry.
Gatter cars were highly maneuverable, they had a low center of mass and thus an excellent road holding. This made them an ideal and popular vehicle for the narrow and windy mountain roads of the fringes of Bohemia.
The Gatter cars were sold at prices not much higher than those of motorbikes. Contemporary advertisement of the Gatter company highlighted this with the slogans “Get a car for the price of a motorbike”.  The Czechoslovak press thus hailed the “Kleine Gatter” as “Volkswagen”, a vehicle for the masses. With an initial price of 12,800 Czech Crowns or 1,000 German Reichsmark, it was the cheapest car of its time in Europe. 
To prove the reliability of small, inexpensive cars, Willibald Gatter participated in the early 1930s in many hillclimbing races in his "Kleine Gatter" and won countless prizes. In 1931, he even challenged Rudolf Caracciola, then world champion. At the Schauinsland race the two unequal opponents met. Caracciola on a Mercedes SSKL with 7069 ccm and 300 h.p. and Willibald Gatter on his “Kleine Gatter” model 1931 with 350 ccm and 9 h.p. While Caracciola won with a time of 8:51 hours for the 720 kilometer long race track, Gatter took 17:38 hours. The press however celebrated Gatter as the true winner and his car as a model of economic viability: He had made the race in a car more than 30 times less powerful in just about twice Caracciola's record time.
With his „Kleine Gatter“, Willibald Gatter won gold medals for the German Mountain Grand Prix ("Grosser Bergpreis von Deutschland") and the Bohemian Mountain Race ("Böhmisches Bergrennen").
When a recession his hit Czechoslovakia in the mid 1930s, which affected especially the industrialized border areas of the country, mostly inhabited by ethnic Germans, Gatter's middle class clientele soon impoverished. By 1937 the “Gatter Autowerk Reichstadt” had to close down.

New beginning after the Second World War
At the end of the Second World War, Willibald Gatter found himself a refugee in Western Germany. Here he attempted to relaunch his car production in the 1950s. 
His aim was again an affordable car for the middle classes, that had little money to spend in the reconstruction years following the Second World War. Willibald Gatter thus built the so-called "Gatter-Mini" during the years 1952 to 1958. Consumer preference for large American-style vehicles made the quest for investment capital difficult. The "Gatter Mini" thus remained a prototype and never went into serial production.

Legacy

Today, Willibald Gatter is considered to be one of the fathers of the “Volkswagen”. In the Czech Republic a Gatter-collector's badge was dedicated to him in 2006, commemorating his 110th birthday and the 80 years since building his first prototype of a “people's car” in 1926, in Czech Lidového Auta.
Today only one unit of the “Kleine Gatter” seems to exist. It is an elegant four seater with reverse gear and chain drive produced in 1932.

References

External links
 Gatter Volksauto webpage 
 Gatter Volksauto literature overview
 Czech Online-Encyclopedia on Willibald Gatter

Motor vehicle manufacturers of Czechoslovakia
Vintage vehicles
Defunct manufacturing companies of Czechoslovakia